Agatheeswarar Temple is a Hindu temple dedicated to Lord Shiva. It is located in Thirumukkudalur village of Karur district, around 15 km from Karur. It is located on the banks of River Amaravathi, very near to the confluence of the rivers Cauvery, Amaravathi and Thirumanimuthaaru.

The main deities in this temple are Sri Agatheeswarar and Sri Anjanakshi Amman. There are also other deities like Brahma, Vishnu, Suryan, Chandran, Agoraveerabadrar, Murugan, Valli, Deivanai.

The temple is in ruins now.

History
The temple is more than 1000 years old. It is mentioned to be built by Rajendra Chola I of Chola Dynasty.

Legend
According to the legend, both sage Agasthya and Vaali had wanted to consecrate a Shiva lingam here. Vaali brought a Kashilingam from Kashi. However, before he reached there, Agasthya had already built a Shiva lingam with sand and consecrated it. As a result, Vaali ended up consecrating his lingam across the river at Ayalur (Sriramasamuthiram) where the temple is known as Valeeswarar temple.

References

External links 
 https://karur.nic.in/tourism/places-of-interest/
 https://m.dinamalar.com/detail.php?id=1567133
 :ta:திருமுக்கூடலூர் அகத்தீசுவரர் கோயில்
 https://lightuptemples.com/temple-detail/sri-agasthiswarar-anjanakshi-temple-karur/827

Hindu temples in Karur district
Karur